Mythimna distincta is a moth in the family Noctuidae. It is found in India and Nepal.

The length of the forewings is 14.7–16.9 mm.

References

Moths described in 1881
Mythimna (moth)
Moths of Asia